Dormeh or Dermeh may refer to:
 Dermeh, Fars
 Dormeh, Kurdistan